Colfax Township is a township in Cloud County, Kansas, USA.  As of the 2000 census, its population was 49.

History
Colfax Township was organized in 1872. It was named for Vice President Schuyler Colfax.

Geography

References

 USGS Geographic Names Information System (GNIS)

External links
 City-Data.com

Townships in Cloud County, Kansas
Townships in Kansas